Ljiljana Jovanović (16 February 1930 - 27 January 2012) was a Serbian actress. She appeared in more than sixty films from 1948 to 2012.

Selected filmography

References

External links 

1930 births
2012 deaths
Actors from Kruševac
Serbian film actresses